The 1973 Monte Carlo Open – Singles was an event of the 1973 Monte Carlo Open tennis tournament and was played at the Monte Carlo Country Club in Roquebrune-Cap-Martin, France between 16 April through 21 April 1973. Ilie Năstase was the defending champion and was top-seeded player. He retained his singles title, defeating Björn Borg in the final, 6–4, 6–1, 6–2.

Seeds

Draw

Finals

Top half

Section 1

Section 2

Bottom half

Section 3

Section 4

References

External links
 ITF tournament edition details

Monte Carlo Singles